These are the results of the women's 56 kg (also known as lightweight) competition in judo at the 1996 Summer Olympics in Atlanta, Georgia.  A total of 22 women competed in this event, limited to jūdōka whose body weight was less than, or equal to, 56 kilograms.  Competition took place on 1996-07-24 in the Georgia World Congress Center.

Results
The gold and silver medalists were determined by the final match of the main single-elimination bracket.

Repechage
The losing semifinalists as well as those judoka eliminated in earlier rounds by the four semifinalists of the main bracket advanced to the repechage.  These matches determined the two bronze medalists for the event.

References

External links
 
  Official Olympic Report

W56
Judo at the Summer Olympics Women's Lightweight
Olympics W56
Judo